The 1981 NAIA men's basketball tournament was held in March at Kemper Arena in Kansas City, Missouri. The 44th annual NAIA basketball tournament featured 32 teams playing in a single-elimination format. The championship game featured Bethany Nazarene College and the University of Alabama in Huntsville. It was the first time the championship game that went into overtime. Bethany Nazarene edged out Alabama-Huntsville with the final score of 86-85 (OT). 1981 was also the first year the NAIA held a women's national basketball championship tournament. For the second time since 1963, the year the award was established, there was a tie for the leading scorer. Todd Thurman, and George Torres both scored 104 over course of the 1981 tournament. There have been no ties since. And for the first time since the Coach of the Year Award was established, Ken Anderson, won Coach of the Year for the second time. No other coach has won the award twice.

Awards and honors
Leading scorers; tie: Todd Thurman, Bethany Nazarene (Okla.); 5 games, 42 field goals, 20 free throws, totaling 104 points (averaging 20.8 points per game); George Torres, Bethany Nazarene (Okla.); 5 games, 33 field goals, 38 free throws, totaling 104 points (averaging 20.8 points per game)
Leading rebounder: Ricky Knight, Alabama-Huntsville. In 5 games, 62 total rebounds (averaging 12.4 rebounds per game)
Player of the Year: est. 1994
All-time leading scorer; second appearance: Tony Carr 13th, Wisconsin–Eau Claire (1979,80,81,82); 15 games, 114 field goals, 45 free throws, totaling 273 points (18.2 average points per game).

1981 NAIA bracket

  * denotes overtime.

Third-place game
The third-place game featured the losing teams from the national semifinalist to determine 3rd and 4th places in the tournament. This game was played until 1988.

See also
1981 NCAA Division I basketball tournament
1981 NCAA Division II basketball tournament
1981 NCAA Division III basketball tournament
1981 NAIA women's basketball tournament

References

NAIA Men's Basketball Championship
Tournament
men's basketball tournament
NAIA men's basketball tournament
NAIA men's basketball tournament
College basketball tournaments in Missouri
Basketball competitions in Kansas City, Missouri